Guido Moda (11 July 1885 – 5 November 1957) was an Italian professional footballer, who played as a defender, and football manager.

Honours

Club 
Milan F.B.C.C.
Prima Categoria: 1906, 1907

External links 
Profile at MagliaRossonera.it 

1885 births
1957 deaths
People from Oderzo
Italian footballers
Italian football managers
Italian expatriate footballers
Association football defenders
A.C. Milan players
A.C. Milan managers
Fenerbahçe S.K. footballers
Italian expatriate sportspeople in Turkey
Sportspeople from the Province of Treviso
Footballers from Veneto